Duke Pius August in Bavaria, full German name: Pius August Herzog in Bayern (born 1 August 1786 in Landshut, Electorate of Bavaria; died 3 August 1837 in Bayreuth, Kingdom of Bavaria) was a Duke in Bavaria as a member of the Palatine Birkenfeld-Gelnhausen line of the House of Wittelsbach. Pius August was a grandfather of Empress Elisabeth of Austria through his son Duke Maximilian Joseph in Bavaria, as well as a great grandfather of Queen Elisabeth of the Belgians and an ancestor of the current generations of the Belgian and Italian Royal Families and the Grand Ducal Family of Luxembourg.

Early life
Born in Landshut, Pius August was the third child of Duke Wilhelm in Bavaria and his wife, Countess Palatine Maria Anna of Zweibrücken-Birkenfeld, sister of King Maximilian I of Bavaria.

Marriage and issue
Pius August married Princess Amélie Louise of Arenberg, daughter of Prince Louis Marie of Arenberg (1757-1795) and his wife, Marie Adélaïde Julie de Mailly-Nesle, dame d'Ivry-sur-Seine (1766-1789), on 26 May 1807 in Brussels. Pius August and Amélie Louise had one son:

 Duke Maximilian Joseph in Bavaria (4 December 1808 – 15 November 1888)

Later life
In 1815, Pius August became an honorary member of the Bavarian Academy of Sciences and Humanities. He loved to travel.

Ancestry

References

1786 births
1837 deaths
People from Landshut
House of Wittelsbach
German Roman Catholics
Dukes in Bavaria
Members of the Bavarian Reichsrat
Heirs apparent who never acceded
Sons of monarchs